Robert Emil Soave Jr.() is an American journalist who is a senior editor for Reason. He is the author of two books: Panic Attack: Young Radicals in the Age of Trump (2019) and Tech Panic: Why We Shouldn't Fear Facebook and the Future (2021). 

Soave was born in and grew up in Detroit and graduated from the University of Michigan. In 2015, he won a Southern California Journalism Award from the Los Angeles Press Club for his writing about the Rolling Stone story "A Rape on Campus". He was named in Forbes' "30 under 30" list in 2016. In 2019, he gained media attention for his writings defending the Covington Catholic High School students involved in the Lincoln Memorial confrontation. He lives in Washington, D.C. with his wife, where he serves on the D.C. Advisory Committee to the U.S. Commission on Civil Rights.

In Soave's first book, Panic Attack: Young Radicals in the Age of Trump, he profiles young progressive activists as well as those on the political right, and discusses issues such as intersectionality, political correctness, and free speech on college campuses.  Writing in The Guardian, reviewer J. Oliver Conroy called Panic Attack "a methodical, earnest and often insightful work of reporting and analysis, not a fiery polemic."  In his second book, Tech Panic: Why We Shouldn't Fear Facebook and the Future, Soave questions conventional wisdom about the negative effects of social media, and argues that increased regulation of platforms like Twitter and Facebook could stifle free speech and do more harm than good.

References

External links

 Author profile and articles at Reason.com
 

American libertarians
Living people
Writers from Detroit
University of Michigan alumni
21st-century American journalists
Year of birth missing (living people)